Westliche Karwendelspitze is a 2385 m above sea level high mountain in the Karwendel on the border between Bavaria and North Tyrol. The summit is part of the Northern Karwendel chain and is located south-east above Mittenwald, from where it can be reached by a cable car.

External links 
 Mountaineering in Toelzer Voralpenland and Karwendel
 Website of Karwendelbahn

References

External links 
 Mountaineering in Toelzer Voralpenland and Karwendel
 Website of Karwendelbahn

Mountains of Bavaria
Mountains of the Alps